The Czech Republic competed at the 2012 Winter Youth Olympics in Innsbruck, Austria. The Czech team consisted of 24 athletes competing in 11 different sports.

Medalists

Alpine skiing

Boys

Girls

Biathlon

The Czech Republic has qualified a full biathlon team of 2 boys and 2 girls.

Boys

Girls

Mixed

Cross country skiing

The Czech Republic has qualified a team of 1 boy and 1 girl.

Boy

Girl

Sprint

Mixed

Curling

The Czech Republic has qualified a mixed team.

Mixed team
Skip: Marek Černovský
Third: Alžběta Baudyšová
Second: Krystof Krupanský
Lead: Zuzana Hrůzová

Mixed Team

Round Robin Results

Draw 1

Draw 2

Draw 3

Draw 4

Draw 5

Draw 6

Draw 7

Quarterfinals

Mixed doubles

Round of 32

Round of 16

Quarterfinals

Figure skating

The Czech Republic has qualified an ice dance pair

Mixed

Freestyle skiing

The Czech Republic has qualified a full team of 1 boy and 1 girl.

Ski Cross

Luge

The Czech Republic has qualified one girl

Girl

Nordic combined 

The Czech Republic has qualified one athlete in Nordic combined.

Boy

Short track speed skating

The Czech Republic has qualified one boy.

Boy

Mixed

Ski jumping

The Czech Republic has qualified one boy and girl in ski jumping.

Boy

Girl

Team w/Nordic Combined

Snowboarding

The Czech Republic has qualified one boy and girl in snowboarding.

Boy

Girl

Speed skating

The Czech Republic has qualified one girl in speed skating.

Girl

See also
Czech Republic at the 2012 Summer Olympics

References

2012 in Czech sport
Nations at the 2012 Winter Youth Olympics
Czech Republic at the Youth Olympics